John Foster (November 27, 1886 – February 16, 1959), was a cartoonist and film director. He is remembered for his direction in over a hundred films, including the Van Beuren Tom and Jerry series and the early (1928) sound-on-film cartoon "Dinner Time".
Later in the 1930s, he created Gandy Goose for Terrytoons.

References

External links
 

1886 births
1959 deaths
American cartoonists
American film directors
American animated film directors
American animators
Terrytoons people
American male artists